Renato Montalbano (born  17 May 1931) is an Italian character actor.

Life and career 
Born in Catania, in 1955 Montalbano abandoned his university studies in medicine to attend at the Centro Sperimentale di Cinematografia in Rome, from which he graduated in 1957. He made his film debut in 1956, and he was among the most active character actors in Italian cinema for about thirty years, alternating genre films and auteur films. Montalbano was also very active on television, where he debuted in 1958 and appeared in dozens of television films and miniseries, often in prominent roles.

Selected filmography 

 Divisione Folgore (1954) - Paratrooper
 La grande savana (1955) - Enrico
 Roland the Mighty (1956) - Gualtiero
 El Alamein (1957) - Parachutist (uncredited)
 The Dragon's Blood (1957) - Gerenot
 La zia d'America va a sciare (1957)
 Slave Women of Corinth (1958) - Osco

 A Man of Straw (1958) 
 Some Like It Cold (1960)
 The Hot Port of Hong Kong (1962)
 Revolt of the Praetorians (1964)
 The Two Gladiators (1964) 
 The Magnificent Gladiator (1964) 
 Lightning Bolt (1965) 
 The Mandrake (1965) 
 Hard Time for Princes (1965) 
 James Tont operazione D.U.E. (1966)  
 Assault on the State Treasure (1967)
 Blood and Bullets (1976) 
 Jesus of Nazareth (1977, TV Mini-Series) - Jairus

References

External links 
 

1931 births
20th-century Italian male actors
Italian male film actors
Italian male television actors
Actors from Catania
Centro Sperimentale di Cinematografia alumni
Living people